Kevin Paul Dillon (born 18 December 1959) is an English former professional footballer born in Sunderland. He played in the Football League for Birmingham City, Portsmouth, Newcastle United and Reading, and was capped once for England under-21. He was first-team manager of League Two club Aldershot Town from November 2009 to January 2011.

Playing career
Dillon began his football career as an apprentice at Birmingham City and signed pro forms in July 1977. He made his debut 4 months later against Leicester City, when he was the last player to be given a debut by the late Sir Alf Ramsey. In the 1980–81 season Dillon made his only England under-21 appearance against Romania.

After 186 league appearances, he left St Andrew's in March 1983 and joined Division 3 side Portsmouth. He was involved in Portsmouth's Division 3 title run-in that season and he also played his part, as Portsmouth went on to finish fourth in Division 2 in both the 1984–85 and 1985–86 seasons. Portsmouth were finally promoted to Division 1 in the 1986–87 season, when they finished as runners-up to Derby County. Pompey only stayed in the top flight for one season, as they finished 19th and were relegated. Dillon had made 206 league appearances for Portsmouth before leaving Fratton Park in July 1989.

Dillon joined Newcastle United and in his first season there, they finished 3rd in Division 2, before losing out to Sunderland in the play-off semi-finals.

In the summer of 1991, Dillon joined Reading on a free transfer. He would spend 3 years at Elm Park and won the Division 2 title in the 1993–94 season before joining Stevenage Borough. He was also both the youth and reserve team manager whilst at Stevenage Borough. He then joined Yeovil Town and finally had a brief spell at Fareham Town at the end of the 1996–97 season.

Management career
Dillon returned to Reading in 1995 and held a number of roles within Reading's academy. He was also reserve team manager before he replaced Martin Allen as Alan Pardew's assistant in November 2001. Under the guidance of the management duo, the Royals were promoted to Division 1 after finishing as runners-up to Brighton & Hove Albion in the 2001–02 season. Pardew resigned in September 2003 and Dillon stepped in as the caretaker manager, until Steve Coppell was appointed in October 2003. At this point Dillon reverted to his role as the number two. Dillon passed his UEFA Pro Licence in 2004 and in the 2005–06 season Reading won the Championship with a record of 106 points. In their first season in the Premier League Reading finished 8th. In May 2007, Dillon followed Coppell's lead in committing himself to Reading for a further two seasons. They were relegated back to the Championship the next season and in May 2009 following the resignation of Coppell, Dillon alongside other first-team coach Wally Downes, left Reading following the team's failure to gain promotion back to the Premier League.

On 9 November 2009, Dillon was confirmed as the new manager of Aldershot Town, succeeding Wycombe Wanderers-bound Gary Waddock. His contract was to run until the end of the 2010–11 season. Against all odds he led the club to the 2009–10 playoffs with a game to spare after a run of just one defeat in ten games. The club's sixth-place finish is still their highest ever league finish to date. Despite such a successful campaign, Dillon made several changes to his squad for the start of the 2010–11 season. He brought in no fewer than ten new faces, including arguably the most eye catching deal of the summer in League Two when he completed the signing of Glen Little from Sheffield United. Despite all the transfer activity, The Shots made a solid start and lost just one of their opening nine league games, as well as progressing through to the second round of the Football League Trophy for the first time in the club's history. But on 10 January 2011, after a run of just two wins in the previous ten League games and with attendances declining, Dillon and assistant Gary Owers left the club by mutual agreement.

References

External links
Dillon's profile at Aldershot Town F.C.'s website

Birmingham City photo and stats at Sporting-Heroes.net
Newcastle United photo and stats at Sporting-Heroes.net

1959 births
Living people
Footballers from Sunderland
English footballers
England under-21 international footballers
Association football midfielders
Birmingham City F.C. players
Portsmouth F.C. players
Newcastle United F.C. players
Reading F.C. players
Stevenage F.C. players
Yeovil Town F.C. players
Fareham Town F.C. players
English football managers
Reading F.C. managers
Aldershot Town F.C. managers
Reading F.C. non-playing staff
English Football League managers